Rana longicrus, also known as the Taipa frog or long-legged brown frog, is a species of frog in the family Ranidae. It is distributed to northern and central Taiwan.

Description
Rana longicrus is a slender-bodied frog with relatively long legs. Males measure  and females  in snout–vent length.

Reproduction
The breeding season in Aoti, northern Taiwan, is from November to March. The smallest mature male measured  SVL and smallest gravid female  SVL. Both sexes appear to reach this size by the end of their first year. Peak breeding occurred in December but is probably influenced by rain. Egg clutches of 600-2,000 eggs are laid in water. Metamorphosis occurs after about two months. However, survival to metamorphosis is low because of disturbance by human activities (plowing of ricefields) and by the desiccation.

Diet
Rana longicrus feed primarily on arachnids and insect larvae and adults (often ants or beetles). In winter when they spend more time near water also crustaceans are eaten.

Habitat and conservation
Rana longicrus occurs in subtropical broad-leaf forests as well as cultivated fields below  elevation. Breeding takes place in marshes, pools, and ponds. It is threatened by habitat loss, in particular due to infrastructure development, but also pollution. It is currently protected in the Yangmingshan National Park.

References 

longicrus
Amphibians of Taiwan
Endemic fauna of Taiwan
Amphibians described in 1898
Taxa named by Leonhard Stejneger
Taxonomy articles created by Polbot